Seth Kwame Dzokoto is a Ghanaian comedian, actor and politician. He is the host to the Edziban show on TV3; which explores Ghanaian food joints and cuisines.

Politics
He contested on the tickets of National Democratic Congress during the 2016 Ghanaian general elections in the Tarkwa-Nsuaem constituency but lost to Mireku Duker of the New Patriotic Party.

Filmography
Efiewura

References 

Living people
Ghanaian comedians
Year of birth missing (living people)
National Democratic Congress (Ghana) politicians